Red Sky at Morning is a 1971 American drama film based on the 1968 Richard Bradford novel of the same name. Directed by James Goldstone, it stars Richard Thomas, Catherine Burns, and Desi Arnaz, Jr.

Plot
The film follows Josh Arnold (Thomas), whose family relocates to Corazon Sagrado, New Mexico, during World War II. The title of the book/film comes from a line in an ancient mariner's rhyme, "Red sky at morning, sailor take warning"

Cast
 Richard Thomas as Joshua Arnold
 Catherine Burns as Marcia Davidson
 Desi Arnaz Jr. as William 'Steenie' Stenopolous
 Richard Crenna as Frank Arnold
 Claire Bloom as Ann Arnold
 John Colicos as Jimbob Buel
 Harry Guardino as Romeo Bonino
 Strother Martin as John Cloyd
 Nehemiah Persoff as Amadeo Montoya
 Pepe Serna as Chango Lopez
 Joaquin Garay as Ratoncito

Awards
The performance by Arnaz earned him the Golden Globe Award as "New Star of the Year – Actor" of 1972.

See also
 List of American films of 1971

References

External links

1971 films
1971 drama films
American drama films
1970s English-language films
Films based on American novels
Films directed by James Goldstone
Films scored by Billy Goldenberg
Films produced by Hal B. Wallis
Films set in New Mexico
Universal Pictures films
American World War II films
1970s American films